Václav Milík Jr. (born 22 May 1993) is a speedway rider who ride for Czech Republic U-21 national team. He is a son of former Czechoslovakian and Czech speedway rider Václav Milík Sr.

He is a seven times champion of the Czech Republic, after winning the Czech Republic Championship in 2012, 2014, 2015, 2016, 2019, 2021 and 2022. With Krystian Pieszczek he won the Czech Under-21 Pairs Final in 2014.

In 2022, he helped Wilki Krosno win the 2022 1.Liga.

Personal life 
His father Václav Sr. was also a speedway rider.

Career details

World Championships 

 Individual U-21 World Championship
 2010 - nominated as wild card for the Final Three
 lost in the Qualifying Round Three also
 Team U-21 World Championship
 2009 -  Gorzów Wielkopolski - 4th placed (2 pts)
 2010 - lost in the Qualifying Round One

European Championships 
 Individual U-19 European Championship
 2010 - lost in the Semi-Final One
 Team U-19 European Championship
 2009 -  Holsted - 4th placed (2 pts)
 2010 -  Divišov - 3rd placed (9 pts)

See also 
 Czech Republic national under-21 speedway team (U-19)

References 

1993 births
Living people
Czech speedway riders